Almadena Yurevna Chtchelkanova is a Russian-American scientist. She is a program director in the Division of Computing and Communication Foundations at the National Science Foundation.

Education 
Chtchelkanova completed a Ph.D. in physics from Moscow State University in 1988. In 1996, she earned a M.A. in the department of computer sciences at University of Texas at Austin. Her master's thesis was titled The application of object-oriented analysis to sockets system calls library testing. James C. Browne was her advisor.

Career 
She worked as a senior scientist for Strategic Analysis, Inc. which provided support to DARPA. She provided support and oversight of the Spintronics, Quantum Information Science and Technology (QuIST) and Molecular Observation and Imaging programs. She worked at the United States Naval Research Laboratory for 4 years in the laboratory for computational physics and fluid dynamics. Chtchelkanova joined the National Science Foundation in 2005. She is a program director in the Division of Computing and Communication Foundations and oversees programs involving high performance computing.

References

External links

United States National Science Foundation officials
University of Texas at Austin College of Natural Sciences alumni
Moscow State University alumni
20th-century Russian women scientists
21st-century American  women scientists
Russian women computer scientists
Women physicists
Computational physicists
21st-century American physicists
20th-century Russian  physicists
Year of birth missing (living people)
Living people